Par Ahu (also Romanized as Par Āhū) is a village in Jolgah Rural District, in the Central District of Jahrom County, Fars Province, Iran. At the 2006 census, its population was 27, in 4 families.

References 

Populated places in Jahrom County